The Bréguet 280T was a French biplane airliner of the late 1920s, created by the manufacturer as a means of finding a civil market for their 19 warplane, as they had once tried before with the 26T.

Development
The 280T was similar to the 26T, using the Bréguet 19's flying surfaces combined with a passenger-carrying fuselage that completely filled the interplane gap. The 280 fuselage was based on the 26T's fuselage but featured refined aerodynamics.

Operational history
A single prototype was evaluated in autumn 1928, followed by eight production machines ordered by Air Union. These were flown on routes between Paris and southern France, between Paris and Switzerland, and (occasionally) between Paris and London. They were joined in service by a 10th machine (converted from one of the 281T prototypes), and six 284Ts with more powerful engines (one of these converted from the other 281T). Two of this latter type were also operated by Air Orient on routes to East Asia. Some of Air Union's 280Ts and 284Ts were still in service when the airline was absorbed into Air France.

Accidents and incidents
On 17 January 1931, Bréguet 280T F-AIVU of Air Union crashed while attempting to land at Lympne Airport in England. The aircraft caught the boundary fence and crashed onto the airfield, damaging the forward fuselage and undercarriage. Of the eight people on board, one of the crew was injured.

Variants
280T
First main production version with a  Renault 12Jb engine, nine built.
281T
Prototypes with  Lorraine-Dietrich 12Ed engines. Two aircraft built, one later converted to 280T, the other to 284T standard.
284T
Second main production version with  Hispano-Suiza 12Lbrx engine, seven built.

Operators

Air Orient operated two Bréguet 284T aircraft.
Air Union operated ten Bréguet 280T and five Bréguet 284T aircraft.
Air France

Specifications (280T)

References

Citations

Bibliography

 
 

Single-engined tractor aircraft
Biplanes
1920s French airliners
 0280T